"Stand Up for Your Love Rights" is a song performed by British pop singer Yazz. It is the follow-up single to her successful single "The Only Way Is Up" and was released in October 1988 as the second single from her debut album, Wanted (1988). The song was a hit in several European countries, peaking at number one in both Finland and Ireland. Additionally, it reached the top 10 in Belgium, Denmark, West Germany, the Netherlands and Switzerland. Outside Europe, the song hit number five on the US Billboard Hot Dance Club Play chart, number eight in New Zealand and number 22 in Australia.

Critical reception
Bill Coleman from Billboard wrote, "Potential smash follow-up to "The Only Way Is Up". Inspirational vocals and rhythm track are enhanced in the fab new mixes. Don't miss the dub." Christ Heath from Smash Hits said, "This starts brilliantly: Yazz chants the song's title, a police siren wails, one of those '70s style orchestras starts up and it launches into an odd tinkly bit that resembles Mel & Kim's "FLM"." He added, "After a while, however, the chorus lodges itself firmly in your brain, you start noticing how good her demented singing is near the end and you realise it will be a jolly big hit after all. Thank goodness for that."

Music videos
Two music videos were filmed to promote the single. The first video, airing in Europe and Australasia, consists mostly of scenes of Yazz singing and accompanied by instrument players (backing vocalists can be seen from time to time too) interspersed with scenes of people dancing and hugging each other. Behind the musicians is a large board with diagrams on it similar to those on the cover of the 12-inch remix single. The second video, which was filmed for the North American market, features scenes of Yazz performing on stage with a band, and footage showing her getting ready to go on stage.

Formats and track listings
 7-inch single
 "Stand Up for Your Love Rights" — 4:21
 "Stand Up for Your Love Rights" (what it is! mix) — 3:57

 12-inch maxi
 "Stand Up for Your Love Rights" (extended) — 7:15
 "Stand Up for Your Love Rights" (y'azzid mix!) — 6:45

 CD maxi
 "Stand Up for Your Love Rights" (7-inch version) — 4:22
 "Stand Up for Your Love Rights" (y'azzid mix) — 6:45
 "Stand Up for Your Love Rights" (extended 12-inch) — 7:15

 12-inch maxi – Remixes
 "Stand Up for Your Love Rights" (the stadium disco mix) — 8:50
 "Stand Up for Your Love Rights" (she's crazy mix) — 7:38

Charts

Weekly charts

Year-end charts

Certifications

References

1988 singles
1988 songs
Acid house songs
Big Life Records singles
House music songs
Irish Singles Chart number-one singles
Number-one singles in Finland
Yazz songs